Pat Farnan (15 July 1893 – 21 October 1980) was an Australian rules footballer who played with South Melbourne in the Victorian Football League (VFL).

Notes

External links 

1893 births
1980 deaths
Australian rules footballers from Victoria (Australia)
Sydney Swans players